is a Japanese manga artist. He is best known for creating Haikyu!!.

Biography
Haruichi Furudate was born on March 7, 1983, in Karumai, Iwate. After graduating from high school, he attended  in Miyagi Prefecture. In 2010, Furudate launched his first full series in Weekly Shōnen Jump, Philosophy School, Yotsuya Sensei's Ghost Stories.

In the next year, Furudate wrote Haikyu!! starting as two one-shots that were published in Jump NEXT! and Weekly Shōnen Jump in January 2011 and April 2011 respectively. The one-shots were later turned into a full series, which started serialization in Weekly Shōnen Jump on February 20, 2012. The series ended in Weekly Shōnen Jump on July 20, 2020. While the series was serializing, it was awarded the 61st Shogakukan Manga Award in the shōnen category and ranked in the top three manga series for the 2015 Sugoi Japan Award. In 2020, the series was in the top five best selling manga in Japan, with over seven million copies sold. The series has also been given numerous adaptations, notably an anime television series and a stage play.

Influences
Furudate was a member of a volleyball club during middle and high school. Furudate often found himself going to school just to participate in the club activities, despite performing below average in classes.

Works

  (One-shot) (2008)
  (serialized in Weekly Shōnen Jump) (2010)
  (serialized in Weekly Shōnen Jump) (2012–2020)

References

External links

1983 births
Living people
Manga artists from Iwate Prefecture